New Damietta is a city in the Damietta Governorate, Egypt. The city is located north of Old Damietta and lies on the Mediterranean Sea. The city was constructed by the New Urban Communities Authority. Its population was estimated at about 51,635 people in 2018.

References 

Populated places in Damietta Governorate
New towns in Egypt
Cities in Egypt